The following article comprises the results of the Hockeyroos, the women's national field hockey team from Australia, from 2016 until 2020. New fixtures can be found on the International Hockey Federation's results portal.

Match results

2016 Results

TPG Tri-Nations Test Series

Great Britain Test Series

China Test Match

Hawke's Bay Cup

International Hockey Open

Champions Trophy

Olympic Games

Trans-Tasman Trophy

International Festival of Hockey

2017 Results

Hawke's Bay Cup

Hockey World League Semifinals

Oceania Cup

International Festival of Hockey

Japan Test Series

2018 Results

Spain Test Series

China Practice Matches

XXI Commonwealth Games

Tri-Nations Hockey Tournament

Hockey World Cup

Hockey Champions Trophy

2019 Results

FIH Pro League

Ready Steady Tokyo

Oceania Cup

FIH Olympic Qualifiers

2020 Results

FIH Pro League

Due to the ongoing worldwide COVID–19 pandemic, all international hockey has been postponed.

References

Australia women's national field hockey team